Football Club Verbano Calcio, or simply Verbano, is an Italian association football club, based in Besozzo, Lombardy. Verbano currently plays in Eccellenza.

History 
The club was founded in 1979 after the merger of Unione Sportiva Besozzo (founded in 1905) and N.A.G.C. Sant’Andrea (founded in 1927).

At the end of the 2010–11 Eccellenza season, Verbano was promoted by repechage to Serie D for the first time.

In the 2012–13 Serie D the club was relegated to eccellenza.

Colors and badge 
The team's colors are red and black.

References

External links
Official Site

Football clubs in Lombardy
Association football clubs established in 1979
1979 establishments in Italy